DeStorm Power (born January 30, 1982) is an American Internet personality who began his career on the social media platform YouTube.

Life and career 

The fourth of eight siblings, Power was born in Arlington County, Virginia and raised in Baltimore, Maryland by his mother, who left his father early in his life. Frequently moving schools, he dropped out of school in the ninth grade, and was regularly sent to juvenile detention for various petty crimes before he began dancing and rapping. Motivated by the birth of his son Tayvion, as well as the local success of his song "We", which featured one of his brothers, Power moved from Baltimore to New York to California to pursue a career in music in 2001, where he spent time homeless before being handed a business card by a talent scout. After interning and ghostwriting at Atlantic Records, Universal, and various other record labels, Power set out to establish himself as a performer, using YouTube as a platform to share his singing, songwriting, and production skills with the online community. Power's videos are typically comedic, and also often incorporate rapping and beatboxing. He was an accomplished triple jumper and Master personal trainer, and was notably invited to the Olympic Trials. Power appeared as Mr. T in the first season of Epic Rap Battles of History from which he achieved a gold record. In 2008 he lost his mother Mashala to stomach cancer. He moved to Los Angeles, California in 2011 where he joined his manager Sara Pena and started Big Frame, a Multi Channel Network and founded Forefront.TV which focuses on urban lifestyle and music. Power moved on to Paradigm Talent Agency for his acting career then William Morris Endeavor before deciding to go independent. In August 2015, Power hosted the reboot of MTV's Punk'd with co-host King Bach, which aired on BET. He is a founder and President of The Zeus Network which launched July 13, 2018  He is a 2011 American Music Awards honoree and was nominated for five Streamy Awards, winning three. He was Emmy Nominated for Outstanding Actor in a Short Form Comedy or Drama Series in 2018 for his original creation Caught The Series.

YouTube career

Caught Series 
On 9 April 2017, DeStorm started a minute long series on Instagram called Caught. The series later would be aired on YouTube and Facebook. This involves DeStorm facing problems with his girlfriend, his side-chick, his friends, enemies and others. Every Sunday, this series ends with a cliffhanger. The Caught series has garnered over 300 Million combined views making it the most watched short form series on the internet. Caught the Series was nominated for an Emmy Award and 4 Streamy Awards, winning two. Season 2 launched on July 13, 2018, on The Zeus Network, an SVOD streaming platform founded by DeStorm Power, King Bach, Amanda Cerny and Lemuel Plummer. The series includes celebrities such as Snoop Dogg, King Bach, Lamorne Morris, Alphonso McAuley, Lele Pons, Reedo Brown, Bradley Martin, Leli Hernandez, Janina, Taylor Stevens, Klarity and many more.

DeStorm Power 
Power's YouTube channel, registered under the username DeStorm, has more than 3.06 million subscribers as of November 2022, and it is used primarily for his musical endeavors. The videos on the channel have been viewed over 568 million times. "Wuz Up World? (What's up World?)"—DeStorm's catch phrase—can be heard at the start or end of every video. DeStorm often composes and performs covers or Beatbox covers of well known songs or creates content for major brands such as Pepsi, GE, Yahoo and Nintendo. DeStorm also creates original content based upon subscribers' challenges and suggestions such as rapping in alphabetical order or name dropping various movie titles in a rap. Power occasionally collaborates with other popular YouTube personalities and recording artists such as Mystery Guitar Man, Freddie Wong, Ray William Johnson, Nice Peter, and Kina Grannis. One of Power's most popular series on the channel is Rap Up, which Power began in 2009. Power also competed in a commercial contest hosted by Heinz Ketchup and was a finalist. Despite the success of his YouTube channel, Power announced in 2013 that his next major song release will be televised on MTV. In April 2013, Power authored an op-ed on New Media Rockstars, detailing his concerns with the broken view counter on his DeStorm channel. He also won two comedy awards. Destorm was also featured as a headliner on the Digitour in the summer of 2010, in which he and other YouTubers traveled around the country performing their songs from YouTube.
In 2014, DeStorm Power was listed on New Media Rockstars Top 100 Channels, ranked at #85.

Notable videos and collaborations

Be Careful 
A mixtape by DeStorm, Be Careful, was released May 1, 2012. Blais, Lone Monk, Christopher Charles, Alex J and Owen Hill Jr. were among the album's producers.

Initially, the album was released in digital and physical CD form; additionally, limited-edition USB keys with the album preloaded onto them were sold soon after release, which were previously only available at a private launch party for the album.

King Kong 
A mixtape by DeStorm, King Kong, was released February 3, 2013.

Awards and nominations

References

External links 
 
 

1982 births
African-American male rappers
Living people
Rappers from Baltimore
Rappers from New York (state)
Southern hip hop musicians
Underground rappers
Vine (service) celebrities
American YouTubers
21st-century American rappers
21st-century American male musicians
21st-century African-American musicians
20th-century African-American people
Cultural depictions of Kanye West